The 16th Regiment Illinois Volunteer Infantry, nicknamed "The Twins" for its long association with the 10th Illinois, was an infantry regiment that served in the Union Army during the American Civil War.

Service
The 16th Illinois Infantry was organized at Quincy, Illinois, and mustered into Federal service on May 24, 1861, for three years service.

The regiment was mustered out of service on July 8, 1865.

Total strength and casualties
The regiment suffered 3 officers and 54 enlisted men who were killed in action or who died of their wounds and 3 officers and 110 enlisted men who died of disease, for a total of 170 fatalities.

Commanders
 Colonel Robert Frederick Smith -  Mustered out with the regiment.

See also
List of Illinois Civil War Units
Illinois in the American Civil War

Notes
the link " http://www.rootsweb.com/~ilcivilw/f&s/016-fs.htm" no longer is valid.

References
The Civil War Archive

Units and formations of the Union Army from Illinois
1861 establishments in Illinois
Military units and formations established in 1861
Military units and formations disestablished in 1865